Lac de Servières is a lake in Puy-de-Dôme, France. At an elevation of 1202 m, its surface area is 0.15 km².

Servieres
Servieres
Landforms of Auvergne-Rhône-Alpes